The 2009 Brisbane Broncos season was the 22nd in the club's history and their first without foundation coach Wayne Bennett. They competed in the NRL's 2009 Telstra Premiership and by the 12th round were leading the competition, but then suffered one of their worst post-State of Origin form slumps ever and spent rounds 16 to 22 outside the top eight. The team managed to finish the regular season 6th (out of 16), qualifying for the finals for the 18th consecutive year. The Broncos then came within one match of the grand final but were knocked out for the 3rd season in a row by eventual premiers the Melbourne Storm (who months later were found to have been cheating the salary cap over the previous four seasons and had all honours achieved during the period nullified by the NRL).

Results
The new post-Bennett Broncos era got off to a thrilling start when they defeated the North Queensland Cowboys 19–18 in round 1 at Suncorp Stadium in the first game under coach Ivan Henjak. Star signing Israel Folau scored his first try in Broncos colours and the first try of the season for the club in the 6th minute, followed by NRL debutantes Antonio Winterstein and Jharal Yow Yeh who also crossed. In round 2 the Broncos defeated the Melbourne Storm for the first time since the 2006 NRL Grand Final. Israel Folau was up against his old club for the first time and scored a try in the 11th minute and second for the year for the Broncos.

For the second year in a row, The Broncos won the opening three rounds of the season when they defeated the New Zealand Warriors 26–10 at Mt Smart Stadium. In the following days Shane Webcke, who had been appointed assistant coach for Brisbane at the start of the season quit his post in the wake of controversy surrounding the release of his new book in which he was critical of some Broncos personnel. Later that week Wayne Bennett returned to Brisbane with the St. George Illawarra Dragons for round 4, coaching against his old club for the first time. Brisbane conceded their first loss of the season in what was also Darius Boyd's first match against his old club and the Dragons' 8th straight win against the Broncos.

The following week, the Broncos continued their 7-year winning streak in the Good Friday match against the Roosters, surviving a strong 2nd-half comeback by the Sydneysiders. In round 7, Darren Lockyer answered his critics as he helped the Broncos to a 40–8 win over the Parramatta Eels at Suncorp Stadium. Lockyer had a hand in most of the Broncos seven tries with Karmichael Hunt scoring three of the seven tries himself. Darren Lockyer's 300th game did not go as planned when they faced the Newcastle Knights in torrential rain at EnergyAustralia Stadium and lost, the match punctuated by a 35-minute half-time break. In round 10, Israel Folau equalled the club record for most tries in a match when he scored 4 tries against the Gold Coast Titans at Suncorp Stadium.

The following week, the Broncos survived a strong Wests Tigers side who were playing their 10th anniversary match, hanging on to win 20–18 at Campbelltown Stadium. In round 13, the Broncos suffered one of their worst defeats in the club's history when they lost 48–4 against the Melbourne Storm at Olympic Park. The loss is also equalled second in the Broncos worst defeats. In round 21, the Broncos were handed their worst ever defeat by the Canberra Raiders 56–0 at Canberra Stadium.

The following week, the Broncos bounced back to keep their finals hopes alive with a 30–10 win over the Cronulla Sharks at Suncorp Stadium. In round 24, The Broncos won their first match against the St. George Illawarra Dragons since round 6, 2005, when they beat the Dragons 12–2 at WIN Stadium. In round 25, the Broncos secured their 18th straight finals appearance when they beat Queensland rivals North Queensland Cowboys 16–10 at Dairy Farmers Stadium. The Broncos were the first opponent for the Gold Coast Titans competing in their first ever finals series. The Broncos survived a late comeback from the Titans holding on to a 40–32 win at Skilled Stadium. The Broncos made it consecutive wins against the St. George Illawarra Dragons for the first time since 2004 and their first win against the Dragons at Suncorp Stadium since 2004 with a 24–10 win against the Dragons in the semi-final at Suncorp Stadium.
Source: Their chances against Melbourne in the grand final qualifier suffered a major blow when in form halfback Peter Wallace broke his ankle toward the end of that win against the Dragons. The Broncos 2009 season came to an end in the Preliminary Final going down 40–10 to eventual premiers, the Melbourne Storm at Etihad Stadium.

Scorers

Ladder

Squad
Bold Players have played International or State any year

Fullbacks
Australian Karmichael Hunt
Australian Dale Copley
Australian Josh Hoffman

Wingers
Australian Israel Folau
Australian Tom Hewitt
New Zealand Antonio Winterstein *Australian Jharal Yow Yeh

Centres
Australian Justin Hodges
Australian Steve Michaels
New Zealand Alex Glenn
New Zealand Gerard Beale

Halves
Australian Darren Lockyer (c)
Australian Peter Wallace
Australian Ben Hunt

Front Rowers
Australian Joel Clinton
Australian Nick Kenny
Australian Josh McGuire
Australian David Taylor
Australian Palmer Wapau

Hookers
Australian Aaron Gorrell
Australian PJ Marsh
Australian Andrew McCullough

Back Rowers
Australian Corey Parker
New Zealand Lagi Setu
Fijian Ashton Sims
Australian Michael Spence
New Zealand Ben Te'o
Australian Sam Thaiday
Australian Will Tupou

Coaching staff

Shane Webcke was an Assistant Coach up until 6 April 2009, when he resigned from his role due to the controversy surrounding his auto-biography "Hard Road". In addition, international cricketer and long-time Broncos fan Andrew Symonds was adopted by the club in an unpaid role assisting the coaching staff following his exile from cricket.

Honours

League
Nil

Club
Player of the year: Corey Parker
Rookie of the year: Andrew McCullough
Back of the year: Justin Hodges
Forward of the year: Sam Thaiday
Club man of the year: Nick Kenny

Player movements

Gains

Losses

Re-signings & Signings

Off contract at end of 2009

Off contract at end of 2010

Off contract at end of 2011

Off contract at end of 2012

References

External links
Brisbane Broncos: Season Review – NRL.com

Brisbane Broncos seasons
Brisbane Broncos season